Speocera is a genus of six eyed spiders in the family Ochyroceratidae.

Species
 it contains eighty-nine species:

 Speocera amazonica Brignoli, 1978 — Brazil
 Speocera amber F. Y. Li & S. Q. Li, 2019 — Madagascar
 Speocera ankalana F. Y. Li & S. Q. Li, 2019 — Madagascar
 Speocera apo Deeleman-Reinhold, 1995 — Philippines
 Speocera asymmetrica Tong & Li, 2007 — China
 Speocera babau Brescovit, Zampaulo, Cizauskas & Pedroso, 2022 — Brazil
 Speocera bachma F. Y. Li & S. Q. Li, 2019 — Vietnam
 Speocera balikpapan F. Y. Li & S. Q. Li, 2019 — Indonesia
 Speocera ballarini F. Y. Li & S. Q. Li, 2019 — Philippines
 Speocera bambusicola Brignoli, 1980 — Kenya
 Speocera batang F. Y. Li & S. Q. Li, 2019 — Indonesia
 Speocera bawangling F. Y. Li & S. Q. Li, 2019 — China
 Speocera berlandi (Machado, 1951) — Angola
 Speocera bicornea Tong & Li, 2007 — China
 Speocera bioforestae Dupérré, 2015 — Ecuador
 Speocera bismarcki (Brignoli, 1976) — Bismarck Archipel
 Speocera bontoc F. Y. Li & S. Q. Li, 2019 — Philippines
 Speocera bosmansi Baert, 1988 — Sulawesi
 Speocera bovenlanden Deeleman-Reinhold, 1995 — Sumatra
 Speocera bukittinggi F. Y. Li & S. Q. Li, 2019 — Indonesia
 Speocera bulbiformis Lin, Pham & Li, 2009 — Vietnam
 Speocera caeca Deeleman-Reinhold, 1995 — Sulawesi
 Speocera capra Deeleman-Reinhold, 1995 — Thailand
 Speocera cattien F. Y. Li & S. Q. Li, 2019 — Vietnam
 Speocera crassibulba Deeleman-Reinhold, 1995 — Java
 Speocera cucphuong F. Y. Li & S. Q. Li, 2019 — Vietnam
 Speocera cuyapo F. Y. Li & S. Q. Li, 2019 — Philippines
 Speocera dayakorum Deeleman-Reinhold, 1995 — Borneo
 Speocera debundschaensis Baert, 1985 — Cameroon
 Speocera decui Dumitrescu & Georgescu, 1992 — Cuba
 Speocera deharvengi Deeleman-Reinhold, 1995 — Thailand
 Speocera dongjing F. Y. Li & S. Q. Li, 2019 — China
 Speocera eleonorae Baptista, 2003 — Brazil
 Speocera fagei (Berland, 1914) — Kenya
 Speocera feminina (Machado, 1951) — Angola
 Speocera gexuejuni F. Y. Li & S. Q. Li, 2019 — China
 Speocera griswoldi F. Y. Li & S. Q. Li, 2019 — Madagascar
 Speocera heilan F. Y. Li & S. Q. Li, 2019 — China
 Speocera huifengi F. Y. Li & S. Q. Li, 2019 — Thailand
 Speocera huisun F. Y. Li & S. Q. Li, 2019 — Taiwan
 Speocera indulgens Deeleman-Reinhold, 1995 — Sulawesi
 Speocera irritans Brignoli, 1978 — Brazil
 Speocera jacquemarti Baert & Maelfait, 1986 — Galapagos Islands
 Speocera javana (Simon, 1905) — Java, Seychelles
 Speocera jucunda Brignoli, 1979 — Brazil
 Speocera karkari (Baert, 1980) — Philippines, Sulawesi, New Guinea
 Speocera krikkeni Brignoli, 1977 — Sumatra
 Speocera lahrak F. Y. Li & S. Q. Li, 2019 — Thailand
 Speocera laureata Komatsu, 1974 — Ryukyu Islands
 Speocera leclerci Deeleman-Reinhold, 1995 — Thailand
 Speocera longyan F. Y. Li & S. Q. Li, 2019 — China
 Speocera manhao F. Y. Li & S. Q. Li, 2019 — China
 Speocera melinh F. Y. Li & S. Q. Li, 2019 — Vietnam
 Speocera microphthalma (Simon, 1892) — Philippines
 Speocera minuta (Marples, 1955) — Samoa, Tokelau, Niue
 Speocera molesta Brignoli, 1978 — Brazil
 Speocera musgo Dupérré, 2015 — Ecuador
 Speocera naumachiae Brignoli, 1980 — Thailand
 Speocera nuichua F. Y. Li & S. Q. Li, 2019 — Vietnam
 Speocera octodentis Tong & Li, 2007 — China
 Speocera onorei Baert, 2014 — Ecuador
 Speocera pallida Berland, 1914 — East Africa
 Speocera papuana (Baert, 1980) — New Guinea
 Speocera parva Deeleman-Reinhold, 1995 — Borneo
 Speocera payakumbuh F. Y. Li & S. Q. Li, 2019 — Indonesia
 Speocera phangngaensis Deeleman-Reinhold, 1995 — Thailand
 Speocera pinima Brescovit, Zampaulo, Cizauskas & Pedroso, 2022 — Brazil
 Speocera piquira Brescovit, Zampaulo, Cizauskas & Pedroso, 2022 — Brazil
 Speocera pongo Deeleman-Reinhold, 1995 — Borneo
 Speocera ranongensis Deeleman-Reinhold, 1995 — Thailand
 Speocera songae Tong & Li, 2007 — China
 Speocera stellafera Deeleman-Reinhold, 1995 — Thailand, Malaysia
 Speocera suea F. Y. Li & S. Q. Li, 2019 — Thailand
 Speocera suratthaniensis Deeleman-Reinhold, 1995 — Thailand
 Speocera tabuk F. Y. Li & S. Q. Li, 2019 — Philippines
 Speocera taprobanica Brignoli, 1981 — Sri Lanka
 Speocera tongyaoi Lin & Li, 2022 — China
 Speocera transleuser Deeleman-Reinhold, 1995 — Sumatra
 Speocera trapezialis F. Y. Li & S. Q. Li, 2019 — Vietnam
 Speocera troglobia Deeleman-Reinhold, 1995 — Thailand
 Speocera trusmadi F. Y. Li & S. Q. Li, 2019 — Malaysia
 Speocera tubularis F. Y. Li & S. Q. Li, 2019 — Madagascar
 Speocera vilhenai Machado, 1951 — Angola
 Speocera violacea Dupérré, 2015 — Ecuador
 Speocera wangi Lin & Li, 2022 — China
 Speocera xiaoxiaoae F. Y. Li & S. Q. Li, 2019 — China
 Speocera xuanson F. Y. Li & S. Q. Li, 2019 — Vietnam
 Speocera zhigangi F. Y. Li & S. Q. Li, 2019 — China

References

Ochyroceratidae
Araneomorphae genera
Spiders of Asia
Spiders of Africa
Spiders of South America
Spiders of Oceania
Taxa named by Lucien Berland